AD/BC is a parody rock opera with music by Matt Berry and lyrics by Matt Berry and Richard Ayoade.  It aired on BBC Three in 2004.

Summary
The opera is a pastiche of the life-of-Christ rock operas popular in the early 1970s, such as Jesus Christ Superstar and Godspell. Sitting at a piano in the late 1970s (1978, several years past the time when Jesus-themed rock operas had been popular), writer Tim Wynde (Matt Berry) introduces his creation as a new telling of the birth of Christ, "told in rock" from the point of view of the Innkeeper.

What follows is a production that parodies early 1970s life-of-Jesus rock operas, including familiar elements such as crowds gathered behind chain-link fencing, 1970s products like chrome floor lamps and telephone booths juxtaposed against the 1 BC Middle Eastern setting; and period-perfect music, clothes, language, and choreography. Repeated comic motifs include the use of poorly synchronized and mixed Dubbing and high, hard-rock-style vocal notes, in the manner of 1970s Robert Plant or Ian Gillan, inserted incongruously and sustained for absurdly long durations.

It was produced by Steve Coogan's production company Baby Cow and features friends and colleagues of the writers, including The Mighty Boosh's Noel Fielding and Julian Barratt, Julia Davis, Rich Fulcher, and Matt Lucas, as well as Berry and Ayoade themselves. It was shown only once on the BBC and was released on DVD in the UK on 19 November 2007.

Cast
 Innkeeper/Tim Wynde – Matt Berry
 Tony Iscariot/Roger Kingsmen – Julian Barratt
 Joseph/C.T. Homerton – Richard Ayoade
 God/Caplan Joyce – Matt Lucas
 Ruth/Maria Preston-Bush – Julia Davis
 Shepherd – Noel Fielding
 Shepherd – Karl Theobald
 Shepherd – Tom Hillenbrand
 Wise Man – Lucy Montgomery
 Wise Man – Lydia Fox
 Wise Man – Sophie Winkleman
 Townsfolk – Graham Linehan, Rob Tofield, Rich Fulcher

External links
 

BBC Television shows
Films directed by Richard Ayoade
Rock operas
2004 television specials
British television specials